Siva is a rural locality (a selo) and the administrative center of Sivinsky District of Perm Krai, Russia. Population:

References

Rural localities in Perm Krai
Populated places in Sivinsky District
Okhansky Uyezd